The Ed Belfour Top Goaltender Trophy is presented annually to the Manitoba Junior Hockey League's goaltender judged to be the best at his position during the regular season.  The trophy was formerly called the MJHL Top Goaltender Award and was renamed in 2018 after former MJHL goaltender and Hockey Hall of Fame inductee Ed Belfour.

Award winners

External links 
Manitoba Junior Hockey League
Manitoba Hockey Hall of Fame
Hockey Hall of Fame
Winnipeg Free Press Archives
Brandon Sun Archives

References

Tender